Vera Rich (born Faith Elizabeth Rich, 24 April 1936 – 20 December 2009) was a British poet, journalist, historian, and translator from Belarusian and Ukrainian.

Biography
Born in London in April 1936, she studied at St Hilda's College of the University of Oxford and Bedford College, London. In 1959, her poetry attracted the attention of the editors of John O'London's Weekly and the following year her first collection of verse, Outlines, was privately produced and received favourable reviews, selling out within six months.

Her translations of the works of Taras Shevchenko, commissioned for the century of his death (1961), received favourable reviews, both in the West and in the Soviet Ukraine. For this work, Rich was awarded an Honorary Diploma in Shevchenko Studies by the Ukrainian Free Academy of Sciences.

Later, influenced by Fr Ceslaus Sipovich, she started also translating Belarusian poetry. Her first translation from Belarusian was the poem "Na čužynie" by Janka Kupala. Her novel Like Water, Like Fire, published in 1971, became the world's first anthology of translations of Belarusian poetry into a western European language. Later she published The Images Swarm Free, a collection of translations of verses by prominent Belarusian authors, including Alés Harun, Maksim Bahdanovič and Źmitrok Biadula. Rich inspired a number of other British people such as Alan Flowers to become involved in promotion of Belarusian culture.

Rich was the founder of Manifold, "the magazine of new poetry". It was started in 1962 and appeared regularly under her editorship until May 1969, when it was suspended owing to her taking a job as Soviet and East European Correspondent for the scientific weekly Nature. At the time of its suspension Manifold had close on 900 subscribers, almost half of them in the USA. This initially temporary job at Nature lasted for more than 20 years. It was only in 1998 that it proved possible to relaunch Manifold. All together, 49 issues were published under Rich's editorship. It published original poetry in traditional and innovative styles, in various variants of English, and – from time to time – in major European languages, as well as translations of poetry from less-known languages.

Vera Rich died in London in December 2009. Her ashes were buried in Ukraine and in the Church of St Cyril of Turau and All the Patron Saints of the Belarusian People in London.

Gallery

Bibliography

Books
 Portents and Images: A Collection of Original Verse and Translations (London, 1963).
 Like water, like fire: Anthology of Byelorussian poetry from 1828 to the present day (1971). .
 The images swarm free: A bilingual selection of poetry (1982). .
 Image of the Jew in Russian literature: The post-Stalin period (1984). .
 Poems on Liberty. Reflections for Belarus (2004). 

Articles

External links
 Vera Rich: translator, journalist, poet and human rights activist, The Times
 Dmytro Drozdovskyi, "ВІКОНЦЕ З НАЙЧИСТІШОГО У СВІТІ СКЛА". Interview with Vera Rich
 Dmytro Drozdovskyi, "Моїми найкращими підручниками були збірки поезії". Interview with Vera Rich
 Вера Рыч. Рэцэпт цуду, an interview for the newspaper Nasha Niva
 50 гадоў творчай дзейнасьці Веры Рыч (50 years of translator work by Vera Rich)
 Беларуская Вера ў Лёндане – інтэрвію на мове анёлаў, an interview for the Belarusian service of RFE/RL
 Examples of Vera Rich's translations, often side by side with the Belarusian versions (bio plus other links as well)
 Dmytro Drozdovskyi, "Голос правди. Перекладач Віра Річ святкує 70-річний ювілей у Києві". Interview with Vera Rich
 Nécrologe. Vera Rich... In memoria "Надзвичайний Посол України" 
 Hanna Kosiv, Віра Річ. Творчий портрет перекладача. 264 c. (Vera Rich. A Portrait of the Translator. 264p.) 2011
 "Vera Rich: The most significant event in my life" — Vera Rich's recollections of her first day at the Belarusian chapel in London
 Jim Dingley, Vera Rich and Guy Picarda – the Centipede’s Dilemma — on Vera Rich's translation process
 Ihar Ivanou, The First Anthology of Belarusian Poetry in English: Sponsors and Censors - history of the Like Water, Like Fire - the first anthology of Belarusian poetry in English

Notes

English women poets
Translators from Belarusian
Ukrainian–English translators
1936 births
2009 deaths
20th-century English poets
20th-century English women writers
20th-century British translators
Journalists from London
Writers from London
Alumni of Bedford College, London
English women non-fiction writers